Hebballi may refer to several places in Karnataka, India:

 Hebballi, Bagalkot, a village in Mudhol Taluk, Bagalkot district
 Hebballi, Chikmagalur, a village in Chikmagalur Taluk, Chikmagalur district
 Hebballi, Chitradurga, a village in Hosdurga Taluk, Chitradurga district
 Hebballi, Dharwad, a village in Dharwad Taluk, Dharwad district
 Hebballi, Uttara Kannada, a village in Sirsi Taluk, Uttara Kannada district

See also
 Hebbal (disambiguation)